Joe Cross (born 30 May 1966) is an Australian entrepreneur, author, filmmaker, and plant-based diet advocate who promotes juicing. He is most known for his documentary Fat, Sick & Nearly Dead in which he tells the story of his 60-day juice fast. He is the founder and CEO of Reboot with Joe, a health and lifestyle brand.

Following the release of his documentary, Cross has published six books about juicing. In February 2014, Cross released his book titled The Reboot with Joe Juice Diet: Lose Weight, Get Healthy and Feel Amazing that became a New York Times best-seller.

Juice fast 
In 2005, Cross weighed 140 kilograms (310 pounds) and suffered from an autoimmune condition, chronic urticaria, for which he had been taking medications such as the steroid prednisone for years. He spent his 30s trying traditional and non-traditional medicine to solve his illness. and unsuccessfully tried various diets in fits and starts. His daily diet mainly consisted of processed foods. Cross was a smoker and consumed alcohol regularly. According to Cross, he believed that his eating habits had caused his illness and he wanted to change his lifestyle. He wanted to get off medication as he believed that the medication or doctors were not able to offer a cure for his condition. In 2005 when he was 39, the doctors told him that with his health, he would die early and he decided to consume only juice for 60 days. Under the supervision of his doctor and a team that monitored his blood work regularly, he started the juice fast in May 2005. For his juice fast, he decided to travel across America while talking to people about their attitudes toward food. He travelled in a truck with a cameraman, a sound guy, a juicer and a generator. Cross survived on nothing but juices for 60 days during his juice fast.

He used an 80/20 rule, according to which he used 80 percent vegetables and 20 percent fruit in the juice that he made to avoid getting too much sugar into his system. Cross used a special juice that he prepared called the Mean Green Juice – a mixture of kale, apples, lemon, cucumber, celery and ginger. But he kept changing the fruits and vegetables used in the juice to ensure he consumed different plants and vegetables.

According to Cross, he felt groggy and unstable the first three to five days. However after consuming only juice for five days, he started feeling well both physically and mentally. After 49 days, he lost 67 pounds (30 kg), his total cholesterol dropped from 204 to 135 and his LDL cholesterol went from 132 to 86. By day 61, Cross had lost 82 pounds and decreased his medicine dosage after reporting a complete loss of his urticaria symptoms. Following the 60-day juice fast, he consumed only foods derived from plants and no animal-based or processed food for 90 days.

As of March 2013, Cross weighed 240 pounds (109 kg), a weight that he maintained for the previous five years. He hit an all-time low of 210 pounds (95 kg) near the end of his first five months on the diet. Cross's future plan includes a juicing launch in the United Kingdom, France, Germany, Russia, Brazil and Chile.

Cross does not recommend the diet as a long term solution and only recommends it as a reboot for the body. According to him, he took up the diet because he wanted a circuit breaker to stop what he was doing and not to adopt it as a permanent lifestyle. One of the misconceptions that Cross tries to correct is that people think he consumes nothing but juice. "That’s not a proper, healthy way to live," adds Cross.

Documentary films

Cross filmed his juice and travel through America, and released Fat, Sick & Nearly Dead in 2011. In the movie, while travelling, Cross meets people and talks to them about their eating habits. The movie features interview segments with people who were inspired to follow his example. He charts his progress with an itemized list of what day of the fast it is, what city and what state Cross is filming in, how much weight he's lost (both in pounds and kilograms) and what kind of medication he's taking. During his road-trip Cross meets and inspires Phil Staples, a morbidly obese truck driver from Sheldon, Iowa, in a truck stop in Arizona to try juice fasting. The movie was originally called Death By Fat. Then it became Faster. However, after Cross came to America to shoot the movie, he had to completely change the concept and the idea of the movie.

The film has been credited with doubling the sales of Breville juicers since the documentary launched on Netflix in the US in July 2011. After completing work on Fat, Sick & Nearly Dead, he continued to travel around the world to promote juicing and also plans to make a second movie about life after juicing. Cross is also involved in negotiations with media companies in the US about a TV series.

A sequel to the film, Fat Sick and Nearly Dead 2 was released in 2014. The sequel follows the lives of people from the first movie, includes expert interviews and shows Cross's effort to maintain his weight. Cross produced another health documentary in 2016: The Kids Menu focuses on stopping childhood obesity.

Reboot with Joe 
After Fat, Sick & Nearly Dead was released in 2010, Cross founded Reboot with Joe, a health and lifestyle brand that provides information and support to people looking to make diet and lifestyle changes. The brand is focused on consuming more fruits and vegetables for improving health. Cross currently serves as the CEO of the organization.
The website of the organization offers guides for starting a juice fast and which fruits and vegetables to select. The organization has a medical advisory board to collect data and conduct research about benefits of juicing.

Books 
Cross released his first book titled Fat, Sick & Nearly Dead in 2011 followed by a second book titled Reboot with Joe Recipe Book (Plant-Based Recipes to Supercharge Your Life) in 2012. He released a third book titled 101 Juice Recipes in 2013.

In February 2014, he released his book titled The Reboot with Joe Juice Diet: Lose Weight, Get Healthy and Feel Amazing. In this book, he shared the plan that he used for his juice fast and subsequent diet as well as stories of some other people who have lost weight with a juice fast. It also includes three-day, five-day, 10-day, 15-day and 30-day programs, healthy-eating plans and exercise tips. According to Cross, when somebody is not eating, they are giving their body a break and supplying it with micro and macro nutrients. Cross recommends using more vegetables and fewer fruits to avoid sugar present in the fruits.
His latest book is titled Juice It to Lose It: Lose Weight and Feel Great in Just 5 Days and had been released in April 2016.

Bibliography 
Fat, Sick & Nearly Dead (2011)
Reboot with Joe Recipe Book (Plant-Based Recipes to Supercharge Your Life) (2012)
101 Juice Recipes (2013)
The Reboot with Joe Juice Diet: Lose Weight, Get Healthy and Feel Amazing (2014)
Reboot with Joe Juice Diet Cookbook (2014)
101 Smoothies (2014)
Reboot with Joe: Fully Charged (2015)
Juice It to Lose It: Lose Weight and Feel Great in Just 5 Days (2016)

References

External links 
Reboot with Joe
Fat, Sick and Nearly Dead

1966 births
Australian food writers
Australian health and wellness writers
Fasting advocates
Living people
Plant-based diet advocates